Steve Furtado (born 22 November 1994) is a professional footballer who plays as a right back for CSKA 1948. Born in France, he represents the Cape Verde national football team.

Club career
Furtado joined US Orléans on 25 June 2017 after a successful spell with US Créteil-Lusitanos. He made his professional debut for Orléans in a 3–1 Ligue 2 win over AS Nancy on 28 July 2017. In July 2022 Furtado signed a contract with CSKA 1948.

International career
Born in France, Furtado is of Cape Verdean descent.
On 1 October 2020, Furtado was called by Cape Verde. He debuted for Cape Verde in a friendly 2–1 win over Andorra on 7 October 2020.

References

External links
 
 
 

1994 births
Living people
People from Creil
Sportspeople from Oise
Cape Verdean footballers
Cape Verde international footballers
French footballers
French sportspeople of Cape Verdean descent
Association football defenders
Ligue 2 players
Championnat National players
Championnat National 3 players
First Professional Football League (Bulgaria) players
US Créteil-Lusitanos players
US Orléans players
Albacete Balompié players
PFC Beroe Stara Zagora players
Cape Verdean expatriate footballers
French expatriate footballers
French expatriate sportspeople in Spain
Expatriate footballers in Spain
French expatriate sportspeople in Bulgaria
Expatriate footballers in Bulgaria
2021 Africa Cup of Nations players
Footballers from Hauts-de-France